Kosmos 204 ( meaning Cosmos 204), also known as DS-P1-I No.3 was a satellite which was used as a radar target for anti-ballistic missile tests.

It was launched aboard a Kosmos-2I 63SM rocket, from Site 133/1 at Plesetsk. The launch occurred at 18:28:00 GMT on 5 March 1968.

It decayed from orbit on 2 March 1969.

Kosmos 204 was the third of nineteen DS-P1-I satellites to be launched. Of these, all reached orbit successfully except the seventh, launched out of sequence.

See also

 1968 in spaceflight

References

Spacecraft launched in 1968
Kosmos 0204
1968 in the Soviet Union
Dnepropetrovsk Sputnik program